Gailes may refer to:

 Gailes, Queensland, Australia
 Gailes Links, Glasgow Golf Club, near Irvine, North Ayrshire, Scotland